Geoff J. Nicholson (born 4 March 1953) is a British novelist and non-fiction writer.

Biography
Geoff J. Nicholson was born in Hillsborough, Sheffield studied English at Gonville and Caius College Cambridge, and Modern European Drama at the University of Essex.

He is generally regarded as a satirist in the tradition of Evelyn Waugh, his writing also being compared favorably with that of Kinsgley and Martin Amis, Jonathan Coe, Will Self and Zadie Smith. The main themes and features of his books include leading characters with major obsessions, sexual and otherwise (guitars, Volkswagens, women's feet and shoes), interweaving storylines and hidden subcultures and societies. His books usually contain a lot of black humour. He has also written several works of non-fiction and many short stories. His novel Bleeding London was shortlisted for the 1997 Whitbread Prize.

His travelogue Day Trips to the Desert was read on Radio 4 by Bill Nighy.

His novel What We Did on Our Holidays was made into the movie Permanent Vacation, featuring David Carradine, directed by W. Scott Peake.

He was a member of the delegation of Los Angeles writers and filmmakers invited by the National Endowment for the Arts to participate in the Guadalajara International Book Festival in 2009.

Bibliography

Novels
 Street Sleeper (1987)
 The Knot Garden (1989)
 What We Did on Our Holidays (1990)
 Hunters and Gatherers (1991)
 The Food Chain (1992)
 The Errol Flynn Novel (1993)
 Still Life with Volkswagens (1994)
 Everything and More (1994)
 Footsucker (1995)
 Bleeding London (1997)
 Flesh Guitar (1998)
 Female Ruins (1999)
 Bedlam Burning (2000)
 The Hollywood Dodo (2004)
 Gravity's Volkswagen (2009)
 The City Under the Skin (2014)
 The Miranda (2017)

Non-fiction
 Big Noises (1991)
 Day Trips to the Desert (1993)
 Andy Warhol: A Beginner's Guide (2002)
 Frank Lloyd Wright: A Beginner's Guide (2002)
 Sex Collectors (2006)
 The Lost Art of Walking (2008)
 Walking in Ruins (2013)
 The London Complaint (2016)
 The Suburbanist (2021)

References

External links
 GeoffNicholsonWriter.com
 Geoff Nicholson at Tripod.com (personal site)
 Geoff Nicholson at Complete Review
 An interview with Geoff Nicholson on Notebook on Cities and Culture

1953 births
20th-century English novelists
21st-century English novelists
English travel writers
Living people
People from Hillsborough, Sheffield
English male novelists
20th-century English male writers
21st-century English male writers
English male non-fiction writers
Writers from Sheffield